Prashanthi Hills is a colony under Meerpet village, Saroornagar mandal, Rangareddy district, Telangana, India.

Currently there are 3 phases of Prashanthi hills colony, DLRL colony is adjacent one.

Ranga Reddy district